= Red Star Shines =

"Red Star Shines" (Chinese: 红星闪闪) is a Chinese patriotic song depicting the revolutionary war against the Kuomintang by the Chinese Communist Party. The song is the theme song of the 1974 red classic movie Shining Red Star (闪闪的红星).

== Lyrics ==
Simplified Chinese

红星闪闪，放光彩；
红星灿灿，暖胸怀。
红星是咱工农的心，
党的关怀照万代。
红星是咱工农的心，
党的光辉照万代。

长夜里，红星闪闪驱黑暗；
寒冬里，红星闪闪迎春来；
斗争中，红星闪闪指方向；
征途上，红星闪闪把路开。

红星闪闪，放光彩；
红星灿灿，暖胸怀。
跟着毛主席跟着党，
闪闪的红星传万代。
跟着毛主席跟着党，
闪闪的红星传万代。

Traditional Chinese

紅星閃閃，放光彩；
紅星燦燦，暖胸懷。
紅星是咱工農的心，
黨的關懷照萬代。
紅星是咱工農的心，
黨的光輝照萬代。

長夜裡，紅星閃閃驅黑暗；
寒冬裡，紅星閃閃迎春來；
鬥爭中，紅星閃閃指方向；
征途上，紅星閃閃把路開。

紅星閃閃，放光彩；
紅星燦燦，暖胸懷。
跟著毛主席跟著黨，
閃閃的紅星傳萬代。
跟著毛主席跟著黨，
閃閃的紅星傳萬代。

Pinyin

hóng xīng shǎnshǎn, fàng guāngcǎi;
hóng xīng càn càn, nuǎn xiōnghuái.
hóng xīng shì zán gōng nóng de xīn,
dǎng de guānhuái zhào wàn dài.
hóng xīng shì zán gōng nóng de xīn,
dǎng de guānghuī zhào wàn dài.

cháng yèlǐ, hóng xīng shǎnshǎn qū hēi'àn;
hán dōng lǐ, hóng xīng shǎnshǎn yíng chūn lái;
dòuzhēng zhōng, hóng xīng shǎnshǎn zhǐ fāngxiàng;
zhēng tú shàng, hóng xīng shǎnshǎn bǎ lù kāi.

hóng xīng shǎnshǎn, fàngguāng cǎi;
hóng xīng càn càn, nuǎn xiōnghuái.
gēnzhe máo zhǔxí gēnzhe dǎng,
shǎnshǎn de hóng xīng chuán wàn dài.
gēnzhe máo zhǔxí gēnzhe dǎng,
shǎnshǎn de hóng xīng chuán wàn dài.

English translation

The red star shines, glowing with rays;
The red star flickers, warming our hearts.
The red star is the heart of us workers and peasants,
The Party's care for us shines for thousands of generations.
The red star is the heart of us workers and peasants,
The Party's care for us shines for thousands of generations.

In the long nights, the red star shines and repels darkness;
In the freezing winters, the red star shines and welcomes springtime;
In the struggle, the red star shines and shows directions;
In the journey, the red star shines and paves the roads.

The red star shines, glowing with rays;
The red star flickers, warming our hearts.
Following Chairman Mao and following the Party,
The shining star passes on for thousands of generations.
Following Chairman Mao and following the Party,
The shining star passes on for thousands of generations.
